The rosters of all participating teams at the women's tournament of the 2009 Rugby World Cup Sevens.

Pool A

Ruan Sims
 Selena Tranter
 Debby Hodgkinson
 Cheryl Soon (c)
 Tricia Brown
 Nicole Beck
 Bo De la Cruz
 Tobie McGann
 Shelley Matcham
 Alexandra Hargreaves
 Tui Ormsby
 Rebecca Tavo

Bai Ying
 Yang Hong
 Sun Tingting
 Gao Yan
 Liu Tingting
 Liu Yan (c)
 Zhao Xinqi
 Fan Wenjuan
 Guan Qishi
 Wang Qianli
 Liu Qianqian
 Ma Jiale

Corinne Lapebie
 Céline Allainmat
 Lucille Godiveau
 Anaïs Lagougine
 Sandrine Agricole
 Fanny Horta (c)
 Emilie Verouil
 Francoise Gomez
 Julie Pujol
 Marie Bourret
 Jeanne Laurence
 Alexandra Pertus

Femke Bakkers (c)
 Alexandra Benthem de Grave
 Dorien Eppink
 Linda Franssen
 Kelly van Harskamp
 Loraine Laros
 Elke van Meer
 Mara Moberg
 Johanna van Rossum
 Pien Selbeck
 Wikke Tuinhout
 Kitty Vloemans

Pool B

Clair Allan
 Kat Merchant
 Charlotte Barras
 Emma Layland
 Danielle Waterman
 Heather Fisher
 Maggie Alphonsi
 Michaela Staniford
 Jo Yapp
 Alice Richardson
 Sue Day (c)
 Rachael Burford

Ayami Inui
 Ryoko Tsuboi
 Tae Shuto
 Mami Okada
 Naoko Hasebe
 Tsukasa Tsujimoto
 Haruka Kamada
 Chie Tanaka
 Mayumi Takahashi
 Keiko Kato
 Ayaka Suzuki
 Marie Yamaguchi

Elena Shevtsova
 Aleksandra Smirnova
 Eugeniya Prikhod'ko
 Aleksandrina Mukhina
 Marina Dumler
 Anna Gottseva
 Natalia Selyutina
 Anna Goryshkina
 Elena Gamova
 Ekaterina Andrianova
 Anastasiya Mukharyamova
 Alexandra Kerzhentseva

Coach:  Jules McCoy

 Amy Daniels
 Christina Mastrangelo
 Ellie Karvoski
 Ines Rodriguez
 Christy Ringgenberg
 Jenn Starkey
 Jessica Watkins
 Pam Kosanke
 Jen Sinkler
 Kelly White
 Alison Price
 Lauren Hoeck

Pool C

Beatriz Futuro Muhlbauer
 Bruna Pamela Lotufo
 Gabriela Bittencourt
 Julia Albino Sarda
 Jessica Santos
 Natasha Olsen
 Mariana Ramalho
 Paula Ishibashi
 Maria Gabriela Avila
 Barbara Santiago
 Emily Barker
 Cristiana Futuro

Kelly Russell
 Maria Gallo
 Mandy Marchak
 Laura Stoughton
 Ashley Patzer
 Brooke Hilditch
 Rosie Cobbett
 Tara Eckert
 Brittany Waters
 Net Bendavid
 Cheryl Phillips
 Tanja Ness

Laura Llado
 Julia Pla
 Marina Bravo
 Isabel Rodríguez
 Raquel Socías
 Bárbara Plà (c)
 Berta García
 Montserrat Poza
 Marta Pocurull
 Angela del Pan
 Agurtzane Obregozo
 Georgina de Swert

Naritsara Worakitsirikun
 Jutamas Butket
 Tidarat Sawatanam
 Butsaya Bunrak
 Ayochai Tummawat
 Piyamat Chomphumee
 Chitchanok Yusri
 Rungrat Maineiwklang
 Uthumporn Liamrat
 Sujitra Suphaphattranon
 Phanthippha Wongwangchan
 Rasamee Sisongkham

Pool D

Sara Pettinelli
 Sara Barattin
 Manuela Furlan
 Valentina Shiavon
 Veronica Schiavon
 Paola Zangirolami
 Maria Diletta Veronese
 Silvia Pizzati
 Maria Grazia Cioffi
 Giovanna Bado
 Cristina Molic
 Silvia Peron

Teresa Te Tamaki
 Huriana Manuel
 Angela McGregor
 Justine Lavea
 Selica Winiata
 Victoria Grant
 Hannah Porter (c)
 Rachel Wikeepa
 Linda Itunu
 Renee Wickliffe
 Carla Hohepa
 Julie Ferguson

Thami Faleni
 Lamla Momoti
 Nombulelo Mayongo
 Marlize Jordaan
 Mandisa Williams (c)
 Saloma Booysen
 Zenay Jordaan
 Aimee Barrett-Theron
 Lorinda Brown
 Phumeza Gadu
 Natasha Hofmeester
 Yolanda Meiring

Christine Kizito
 Rosenburg Kanyunyuzi
 Aimie Atyang
 Helen Buteme (c)
 Rachael Babirye
 Harriet Kayonjo
 Justine Bayiga
 Aaliya Adania
 Brenda Kayiyi
 Agnes Nantongo
 Prossy Nakakande
 Charlotte Mudolu

References

Rugby World Cup Sevens squads
Squads
World